The Cater Museum is a small local museum in Billericay, in the English county of Essex.

The museum was established by Alice May Cater, in honour of her late husband William Alexander Cater who was a local antiquarian. It was opened to the public on 7 May 1960. The museum is a registered charity and is located at 74 High Street, Billericay. It lies within a Grade II listed, 18th-century, red-brick-fronted building.

The museum stores numerous local artefacts over three floors, including information on local families and buildings. Amongst the artefacts are: reports of the Zeppelin that was downed in the area during World War I; the remains of a three-headed lamb born in the area; and the door of the house once owned by Christopher Martin, who was a passenger aboard the Mayflower.

In 2002, a Victorian kitchen garden was opened at the rear of the museum where a number of Elizabethan herbs were planted. In 2008, the museum received £41,000 of Nationsl Lottery funding  to carry out renovation of the rear of the building to restore it to its original 18th-century character. While this renovation was being carried out, a number of artefacts were discovered in the garden, some dating from around the 1860s. Items included Victorian pipes, ginger beer jars and medicine bottles; many of these were added to the museum's collection.

References

Museums in Essex
Billericay
Local museums